David Klein, A.S.C. (born December 1972) is an American cinematographer known for working with director Kevin Smith on the films Clerks, Mallrats, Chasing Amy, Clerks II, Zack and Miri Make a Porno, Cop Out, and Red State.   

Klein, a member of the American Society of Cinematographers, was the director of photography for True Blood on HBO and for Homeland on Showtime. Klein was hired for the latter position beginning with Homeland'''s third season, taking over cinematographer duties from Nelson Cragg who had served as the series' director of photography for two seasons.

In 2020, Klein served as the cinematographer on an episode of The Mandalorian'', titled "Chapter 14: The Tragedy", which was directed by Robert Rodriguez. He also served as cinematographer on multiple episodes of The Book of Boba Fett.

References

External links

1972 births
American cinematographers
Living people
Place of birth missing (living people)